Thomas Horsfield (May 12, 1773 – July 24, 1859) was an American physician and naturalist who worked extensively in Indonesia, describing numerous species of plants and animals from the region. He was later a curator of the East India Company Museum in London.

Early life
Horsfield was born in Bethlehem, Pennsylvania, and studied medicine at the University of Pennsylvania. He was the grandson of Timothy Horsfield, Sr. (1708-1773), who was born in Liverpool and emigrated to New York in 1725. In New York, his brother Isaac and he ran a butcher shop. The Horsfield family converted from the Church of England to Moravianism, a Protestant denomination with a strong emphasis on education. In 1748, Horsfield, Sr. applied for permission to reside in Bethlehem, Pennsylvania. He, however, moved only his family to Bethlehem and joined them the next year. When Northampton County was created in 1752, he was made a justice of peace by Governor Hamilton. In 1763 he was commissioned a colonel in the forces defending the frontiers against Indian raids. One of the sons, Joseph Horsfield was a delegate in the Pennsylvania convention to ratify the Federal Constitution. Grandfather Horsfield was a friend of Benjamin Franklin and finds mention in the latter's autobiography. Horsfield's father was Timothy Horsfield, Jr. (died April 11, 1789) and he married Juliana Sarah Parsons of Philadelphia in 1738. Thomas Horsfield was born in Bethlehem on May 12, 1773. He went to school at the Moravian schools in Bethlehem and Nazareth. He took an interest in biology and took a pharmacy course under a Dr Otto (probably John Frederick Otto MD, of Nazareth). In 1798, he graduated in medicine from the University of Pennsylvania, his thesis being on the effects of poison ivy.

Travels in Asia
In 1799, he accepted a post as surgeon on the vessel China, a merchant vessel that was to sail to Java. He passed through Batavia and was struck by the beauty of the region. In 1801, he applied to be a surgeon with the Dutch Colonial Army in Batavia. Taking up appointment there, he took a keen interest in the flora, fauna, and geology of the region. The East India Company took control of the island from the Dutch in 1811, and Horsfield began to collect plants and animals on behalf of the governor and friend Sir Thomas Stamford Raffles. In 1816, Java was restored to the Dutch and Horsfield moved west to Sumatra. In 1819, he was forced to leave the island due to ill health, and returned to London on board the Lady Raffles.

England
On returning to London, Horsfield continued to be in contact with Sir Stamford Raffles and became a keeper of the museum of the East India Company on Leadenhall Street, London, working under Charles Wilkins. He stayed in this position, later as a curator, until his death on July 24, 1859. Horsfield took an interest in geology, botany, zoology, and entomology. He was influenced by William Sharp Macleay and his quinarian system of classification. He was a fellow of the Royal Society of London (1828) and a fellow of the Linnean Society (1820), later becoming a vice president. In 1828, he was elected a member of the American Philosophical Society. Horsfield was appointed assistant secretary of the Zoological Society of London at its formation in 1826. In 1833, he was a founder of what became the Royal Entomological Society of London. He was elected a fellow of the Royal Society in 1828. In 1838, he became correspondent of the Royal Institute of the Netherlands; when that became the Royal Netherlands Academy of Arts and Sciences in 1851, he joined as foreign member. Horsfield died at his home in Camden Town and was buried at the Moravian cemetery in Chelsea.

Published works

Horsfield wrote Zoological Researches in Java and the Neighbouring Islands (1824). He also classified a number of birds with Nicholas Aylward Vigors, most notably in their A Description of the Australian Birds in the Collection of the Linnean Society; With an Attempt at Arranging them According to Their Natural Affinities (Trans. Linn. Soc. Lond. (1827)). Together with the botanists Robert Brown and John Joseph Bennett he published the Plantae Javanicae rariores (1838–52).

Horsfield is commemorated in the names of a number of animals and plants, including:
 Javanese flying squirrel, Iomys horsfieldii
 Horsfield's fruit bat, Cynopterus horsfieldi
 Horsfield's shrew, Crocidura horsfieldi
 Horsfield's bat, Myotis horsfieldii, a species of small bat in the family Vespertilionidae
 Horsfield's flying gecko, Ptychozoon horsfieldi, a species of Asian gliding lizard
 Russian tortoise, Testudo horsfieldii 
 Horsfield's spiny lizard, Salea horsfieldii, a species of agamid lizard found in southern India in the Nilgiri and Palni Hills
 Malabar whistling thrush, Myophonus horsfieldii, a bird found in peninsular India
 Indian scimitar-babbler, Pomatorhinus horsfieldii, an Old World babbler found in peninsular India
 White's thrush (Horsfield's thrush), Zoothera horsfieldi, a resident bird in Indonesia.
 Oriental cuckoo, Cuculus horsfieldi
 Horsfield's bronze cuckoo, Chrysococcyx basalis
 Common darkie, Paragerydus horsfieldii, a small butterfly found in India
 Arhopala horsfieldi, a butterfly of the family Lycaenidae found in Asia
 South Indian blue oakleaf, Kallima horsfieldii, a nymphalid butterfly found in India
 Horsfieldia, a plant genus in the family Myristicaceae native to Southeast Asia
 Horsfield's Tarsier, Cephalopachus bancanus

See also
 :Category:Taxa named by Thomas Horsfield

References

External links
 Thomas Horsfield – An American Enigma

1773 births
1859 deaths
American entomologists
American naturalists
American ornithologists
British East India Company people
Fellows of the Royal Society
Members of the Royal Netherlands Academy of Arts and Sciences
People from Bethlehem, Pennsylvania